EMAS or Emas may refer to:

Places
 Emas National Park, Brazil
 Emas, Paraíba, Brazil

Other uses
 E.M.A.S., 2003 Malaysian-language album by Siti Nurhaliza
 EMAS (company), an oil and gas industry equipment company
 Emas (Malaysian TV channel)
 Emas bond, a Malaysian financial instrument
 Caloptilia emas, a moth of the family Gracillariidae
 East Midlands Ambulance Service, in England
 Eco-Management and Audit Scheme, a European environmental management instrument
 Edinburgh Multiple Access System, a computer operating system
 EMAS Canada, a medical charity
 Engineered materials arrestor system, designed to mitigate runway excursions
 European Menopause and Andropause Society, a European medical association
 Expressway Monitoring and Advisory System, in Singapore
 MTV Europe Music Awards, a music awards show
 Proton EMAS, a range of concept cars

See also
 EMA (disambiguation)